The Ronald River is a river in the Côte-Nord region of Quebec, Canada. It is a left tributary of the MacDonald River.

Location

The Ronald River is the Sept-Rivières Regional County Municipality, Côte-Nord, Québec, Canada.
It is in a region with Köppen climate classification Dfc (Subarctic climate).
It is a tributary of the Rivière MacDonald, which in turn is a tributary of the Rivière aux Rochers.
The river is used by salmon.
It will be completely contained within the proposed Lake Walker National Park.

Lac Fraser is oriented with the axis of the river valley at its head.
It may be accessed by a  trail for off-road vehicles.

As of 2013 fishing for atlantic salmon was prohibited year round.
Fishing for other species was restricted to fly fishing, and was allowed from mid-May to early September.

Course

The upper part of the river has a series of short flat stretches alternating with sloping sections.
The upper section of the river runs through a narrow valley in a NNE-SSW direction, cutting through a hilly plateau.
The river follows many fractures in the bedrock and structural depressions, and also has winding or rectilinear thalwegs.
Lower down after crossing a rocky threshold the valley broadens into a trough-shaped glacial valley, still oriented NNE-SSW due to the structure of this part of the Laurentian shield.
The river becomes more regular, and meanders through glacial materials that it has modified and redistributed over the valley floor.
The flanks of the valley are steep, particularly on the east side.

Geology

The Ronald River Valley and the hills to the east have a few gneiss enclaves, which differ from gneisses found elsewhere in the park in having pyroxenes associated with amphibole and biotite, forming minute rust spots.
Thick deposits identified as sections of moraine have been identified along the Ronald River.
There fluvio-glacial deposits would have been torn off and transported by the glacier, then deposited in separate layers by meltwater.
There are scattered accumulations of glacial deposits from dead-ice moraines along hanging valleys such as North Manikis Creek, east of the Ronald River Valley.

Notes

Sources

Rivers of Côte-Nord